Six Mile Creek drains a large area south and west of Lake Minnetonka, in Hennepin and Carver Counties, Minnesota, United States. It ends on the western shore of Halstead's Bay, the westernmost bay of Lake Minnetonka. It runs through mostly agricultural land but this area is also seeing more residential development.

Lake Pierson forms the headwaters of the creek, which then flows in this order through, Marsh Lake, Wasserman Lake, Lake Auburn, Lunsten Lake, Parley Lake, Mud Lake and then reaches its destination, Lake Minnetonka.

It has a very low gradient which often results in backwater (stagnant) conditions. Wasserman and Parley Lakes have Department of Natural Resources public boat accesses.

Other lakes in the watershed whose outflow eventually ends up in Six Mile are: Carl Krey, Church, Crosby, Stieger, Stone, Sunny, Turbid, and Zumbra.

External links
 Minnehaha Creek Watershed District (MCWD) Map
 MCWD Creek information

Rivers of Minnesota
Rivers of Carver County, Minnesota
Rivers of Hennepin County, Minnesota